Carl Leonard Simon, born 17 October 1973 in St John's, Antigua, is a West Indian cricketer who has played first-class and List A cricket for the Leeward Islands.

References

1973 births
Living people
People from St. John's, Antigua and Barbuda
Leeward Islands cricketers
Antigua and Barbuda cricketers